Johannes Schmidt (11 March 1908 in Gotha – 23 December 1976 in Offenbach am Main) was a member of the Sicherheitsdienst (SD), the intelligence agency of the Schutzstaffel (SS).  On 30 June 1934, Schmidt shot Hitler's predecessor as Reichschancellor, Kurt von Schleicher, on behalf of Reinhard Heydrich, during the political purge of the Nazi Government known as Night of the Long Knives.

References

Sources 
 Dederichs, M. (2009) Heydrich. The Face of Evil.

1908 births
1976 deaths
People from Gotha (town)
People from Saxe-Coburg and Gotha
German assassins
Gestapo personnel
SS personnel